The Rioni is the main river of western Georgia.  It originates in the Caucasus Mountains, in the region of Racha and flows west to the Black Sea, entering it north of the city of Poti (near ancient Phasis). The city of Kutaisi, once the ancient city of Colchis, lies on its banks. It drains the western Transcaucasus into the Black Sea while the river Kura, drains the eastern Transcaucasus into the Caspian Sea.

History

Ancient authors 
Known to the ancient Greeks as the river Phasis, the Rioni was first mentioned by Hesiod in his Theogony (l.340); Plato has Socrates remark: "I believe that the earth is very large and that we who dwell between the pillars of Hercules and the river Phasis live in a small part of it about the sea, like ants or frogs about a pond" (Phaedo, 109a). Later writers like Apollonius Rhodius (Argonautica 2.12.61), Virgil (Georgics 4.367) and Aelius Aristides (Ad Romam 82) considered it the easternmost limit of the navigable seas.   Herodotus and Anaximander considered Rioni a boundary between Europe and Asia. The famed voyage of Jason and the Argonauts, though semi-mythological, was said to have occurred by the Argonauts sailing up the river Phasis from its outlet to the Black Sea at Poti, to Colchis (modern Kutaisi in Georgia).

Pheasant 
The term "pheasant" and the scientific name Phasianus colchicus are derived from "Phasis" and "Colchis", as this was said to be the region from which the common pheasant was introduced to Europe (the ring-necked pheasants were introduced later from East Asia).

Draining 
It is said that "the failure of Colchis to emerge as a strong kingdom or to be maintained as a province of Rome has been blamed on the pestilential climate of the Phasis Valley, a situation remarked upon by travelers down to modern times, when the swamps were finally drained."

Description 
The Rioni is the longest river wholly within the borders of Georgia. Its largest tributaries are, from source to mouth: Jejora (left), Qvirila (left), Khanistsqali (left), Tskhenistsqali (right) and Tekhuri (right).

Phasis river at Taprobana

Stephanus of Byzantium wrote that there was also another river which was named Phasis, in Taprobana (Ceylon or Sri Lanka).

References

Rivers of Georgia (country)
Tributaries of the Black Sea